KQPZ (95.9 FM) is a radio station licensed to serve Lewistown, Montana. The station is owned by Montana Broadcast Communications, Inc. It airs a rock music format.

The station was assigned the KLCM call letters by the Federal Communications Commission on May 2, 1978. The station changed its call sign to KQPZ and its format to rock on April 1, 2018 after 43 years with its classic hits format.

References

External links
KQPZ official website

QPZ
Classic hits radio stations in the United States
Radio stations established in 1975
Fergus County, Montana